Nectandra yarinensis is a species of plant in the family Lauraceae. It is endemic to Peru.

References

yarinensis
Endemic flora of Peru
Trees of Peru
Data deficient plants
Least concern biota of South America
Taxonomy articles created by Polbot